Oleg Nikolayevich Tselkov (15 July 1934 — 11 July 2021) was a Russian nonconformist artist, celebrated for his images of faces painted in bright color, depicting inner psychological patterns of violence in contemporary culture.

Biography
In 1956 he had his first apartment exhibition in the Vladimir Slepyan (1930–1998) houseroom. In 1958 he graduated from the Saint Petersburg State Theatre Arts Academy, where he studied under experimental scenic designer and theatre director Nikolay Akimov. In the 1960s and 1970s, the Tselkov studio in Moscow was visited over the years by such celebrities as, Arthur Miller, David Alfaro Siqueiros, Renato Guttuso, Lilya Brik, Anna Akhmatova, Joseph Brodsky, Yevgeny Yevtushenko (close friend of Tselkov), Louis Aragon, and Pablo Neruda.

The first Tselkov solo exhibition was opened in Kurchatov Institute in January 1966, but after two days it was closed by the KGB for being ideologically unacceptable.
In 1977 Tselkov moved to Paris. Some time later, he bought a farm in the Champagne region of France, 300 km from Paris. There he equipped a two-floor studio where he lived and worked.

Bibliography
 
 
 
 
  
  pp. 50–59

References

External links
 Artworks on the artnet 
 24 results last years Sotheby's Auction.
 Tatyana Borodina on Oleg Tselkov exhibition at ABA Gallery in Manhattan, New York, 2013. Details of Tselkov biography (on Russian). 
 VIDEO: Oleg Tselkov speak on the subject matter of his paintings in Aktis Gallery, 2010. There are also some recognizable sculptures of master. 
 VIDEO from Tselkov exhibition in Moscow, Summer 2014. The artist has told some of stories from his past and formulated his paintings philosophical conception.

1934 births
2021 deaths
20th-century Russian painters
Russian male painters
21st-century Russian painters
21st-century Russian sculptors
20th-century Russian sculptors
20th-century Russian male artists
Russian male sculptors
Russian State Institute of Performing Arts alumni
Belarusian State Academy of Arts alumni
People from Krasnogorsky District, Moscow Oblast
21st-century Russian male artists